Donald Richard "Dino" Hall (born December 6, 1955) is a former American football running back and return specialist in the National Football League (NFL). He was signed by the Cleveland Browns as an undrafted free agent in 1979. He played college football at Glassboro State.

He attended Pleasantville High School.

References

External links
 Dino Hall on Pro-Football-Reference

1955 births
Living people
Pleasantville High School (New Jersey) alumni
American football running backs
Rowan Profs football players
Cleveland Browns players
People from Pleasantville, New Jersey

Players of American football from New Jersey
Sportspeople from Atlantic City, New Jersey